Some Other Time is an album by American jazz pianist John Hicks recorded in 1981 and released on the Theresa label. The 1995 Evidence CD reissue added three bonus tracks.

Reception
Allmusic awarded the album 3 stars stating "A flexible jazz pianist who can fit in comfortably in settings ranging from bop to fairly free, John Hicks is in excellent form during this straightforward set".

Track listing
All compositions by John Hicks except as indicated
 "Naima's Love Song" - 6:16
 "Mind Wine" - 3:35
 "Peanut Butter in the Desert" - 4:52
 "Ghost of Yesterday" (Arthur Herzog Jr., Irene Kitchings) - 3:53
 "Some Other Time"  (Leonard Bernstein, Betty Comden, Adolph Green)	2:27
 "With Malice Toward None" (Tom McIntosh) - 4:47
 "Dark Side, Light Side" (George Cables) - 7:22
 "Night Journey" (Tex Allen) - 6:30	Bonus track on CD reissue	
 "After the Morning" - 7:37 Bonus track on CD reissue			
 "Epistrophy" (Kenny Clarke, Thelonious Monk) - 4:16 Bonus track on CD reissue
tracks 8 & 9 recorded on May 19, 1982 at Different Fur Studios, San Francisco, CA, track 10 recorded on August 13, 1984 in San Francisco, CA

Personnel
John Hicks - piano
Walter Booker - bass (tracks 1-3, 6-8 & 10) 
Idris Muhammad - drums (tracks 1-3, 6-8 & 10) 
Olympia Hicks - piano (track 9)

References

Theresa Records albums
John Hicks (jazz pianist) albums
1981 albums